Carol Parsons (born 6 February 1956) is a British equestrian. She competed in two events at the 1992 Summer Olympics.

References

External links
 

1956 births
Living people
British female equestrians
British dressage riders
Olympic equestrians of Great Britain
Equestrians at the 1992 Summer Olympics
People from Saint Helier